Mayfield is an unincorporated community on the southern shore of Lake Mayfield in Lewis County, Washington.  It is located off U.S. Route 12, east of Silver Creek. The Mayfield Dam, which supplies hydroelectricity to Tacoma and its neighboring cities, sits 1-mile west of the area.

History
Before the arrival of non-native settlers, the location was used as a village for Native American people. A post office for the territory was established in 1890 or 1891 and named Ferry, in recognition of Washington state's first governor.  The community's eponym changed to Mayfield in either 1891 or 1895 and was done so in homage to the location's first postmaster, H.T. (or W.H.) Mayfield.

The original center of the town was vacated and razed, with homes relocated to the surrounding area, beginning in 1955 during the building of the Mayfield Dam. The post office would be moved, but quickly close, in 1962 when the area was flooded over that year just as the dam neared completion; the old town is permanently underwater.

References

Populated places in Lewis County, Washington
Unincorporated communities in Lewis County, Washington
Unincorporated communities in Washington (state)